Endochondral ossification is one of the two essential processes during fetal development of the mammalian skeletal system by which bone tissue is produced. Unlike intramembranous ossification, the other process by which bone tissue is produced, cartilage is present during endochondral ossification. Endochondral ossification is also an essential process during the rudimentary formation of long bones, the growth of the length of long bones, and the natural healing of bone fractures.

Growth of the cartilage model
The cartilage model will grow in length by continuous cell division of chondrocytes, which is accompanied by further secretion of extracellular matrix. This is called interstitial growth.
The process of appositional growth occurs when the cartilage model also grows in thickness due to the addition of more extracellular matrix on the peripheral cartilage surface, which is accompanied by new chondroblasts that develop from the perichondrium.

Primary center of ossification

The first site of ossification occurs in the primary center of ossification, which is in the middle of diaphysis (shaft). Then:

Formation of periosteum
 The perichondrium becomes the periosteum. The periosteum contains a layer of undifferentiated cells (osteoprogenitor cells) which later become osteoblasts. 
Formation of bone collar
 The osteoblasts secrete osteoid against the shaft of the cartilage model (Appositional Growth). This serves as support for the new bone.
Calcification of matrix
 Chondrocytes in the primary center of ossification begin to grow (hypertrophy). They stop secreting collagen and other proteoglycans and begin secreting alkaline phosphatase, an enzyme essential for mineral deposition. Then calcification of the matrix occurs and osteoprogenitor cells that entered the cavity via the periosteal bud, use the calcified matrix as a scaffold and begin to secrete osteoid, which forms the bone trabecula. Osteoclasts, formed from macrophages, break down spongy bone to form the medullary (bone marrow) cavity.

Secondary center of ossification
About the time of birth in mammals, a secondary ossification center appears in each end (epiphysis) of long bones. Periosteal buds carry mesenchyme and blood vessels in and the process is similar to that occurring in a primary ossification center. The cartilage between the primary and secondary ossification centers is called the epiphyseal plate, and it continues to form new cartilage, which is replaced by bone, a process that results in an increase in length of the bone. Growth continues until the individual is about 20 years old or until the cartilage in the plate is replaced by bone. The point of union of the primary and secondary ossification centers is called the epiphyseal line.

Appositional bone growth
The growth in diameter of bones around the diaphysis occurs by deposition of bone beneath the periosteum. Osteoclasts in the interior cavity continue to resorb bone until its ultimate thickness is achieved, at which point the rate of formation on the outside and degradation from the inside is constant.

Histology

During endochondral ossification, five distinct zones can be seen at the light-microscope level.

Fracture healing
During fracture healing, cartilage is often formed and is called callus. This cartilage ultimately develops into new bone tissue through the process of endochondral ossification. Recently it has been shown that biomimetic bone like apatite inhibits formation of bone through endochondral ossification pathway via hyperstimulation of extracellular calcium sensing receptor (CaSR).

Examples in human body
Tubular and flat bones, vertebrae, the skull base, ethmoids, and the ends of the clavicles are formed by endochondral ossification.

Additional images

See also
Intramembranous ossification
Ossification

References

Animal developmental biology
Skeletal system